Manuel Meli (born 25 March 1995) is an Italian voice actor. Meli contributes to voicing characters in cartoons, anime, movies, and sitcoms.

Meli was born in Rome. He is known for providing the voice of Phineas Flynn in the Italian-language version of the Disney Channel original animated series Phineas and Ferb. He is also well known for voicing Cody Martin in the Italian-language versions of The Suite Life of Zack & Cody and The Suite Life on Deck

Meli works at Dubbing Brothers, C.D. Cine Dubbing, LaBibi.it, and other dubbing studios in Italy.

Dubbing roles

Anime and animation
 
 Natsu Dragneel in Fairy Tail
 Phineas Flynn in Phineas and Ferb
 Phineas Flynn/Phineas-2 in Phineas and Ferb the Movie: Across the 2nd Dimension
 Leo in Little Einsteins
 Brewster in Chuggington
 Lelouch Lamperouge (younger) in Code Geass
 Jude Sharp in Inazuma Eleven
 Tod in The Fox and the Hound 2
 Hajime in Prétear
 Tad in Finding Nemo
 Leo in Little Einsteins
 Charlie in Charlie and Lola
 Binky in The Fairly OddParents
 Wayne in Higglytown Heroes
 Tarzan in Tarzan II
 Logan Rivera in Sarah Lee Jones (since 2015)
 Richie Rich in Harvey Girls Forever!
 Thumper in Bambi II
 Rintoo in Ni Hao, Kai-Lan
 Ernie Krinklesac in The Cleveland Show
 Diego in Go, Diego, Go!
 Roo in Pooh's Heffalump Movie
 George Little in Stuart Little: The Animated Series
 Cheng in Skyland
 Jib in Candy Land: The Great Lollipop Adventure
 Eckle in Planet 51
 Lewis in Meet the Robinsons
 Ash Fox in Fantastic Mr. Fox
 Kazuya Gordon in Scan2Go
 Shō in Arrietty
 Banagher Links in Mobile Suit Gundam Unicorn
 Seiji Amasawa in Whisper of the Heart
 Hikaru Kujo in Futari wa Pretty Cure Max Heart
 Niko in The Flight Before Christmas
 Yankee Irving in Everyone's Hero
 Kenny in Firebreather
 Shoma Takakura and Penguin 2 in Mawaru Pingudoramu
 Fred Luckpuig in Lucky Fred
 Bala in The Jungle Book
 Taiki Kudou in Digimon Fusion

Live action shows and films
 
 Nick Daley in Night at the Museum
 Ronnie Tyler in The Fourth Kind
 Evan Taylor in August Rush
 Eddie Tudor and Tom Canty in A Modern Twain Story: The Prince and the Pauper
 Billy Madsen in Wild Hogs
 Micheal Myers in Halloween (2007 film)
 Cody Martin in The Suite Life of Zack & Cody
 Cody Martin in The Suite Life on Deck
 Cody Martin in The Suite Life Movie
 Josh in Blue's Clues & You
 James "JJ" Powell, Jr in No Ordinary Family
 Arthur in Arthur and the Revenge of Maltazard
 Tom Brooks in Gary Unmarried
 Jack in Everybody's Fine (2009 film)
 Lee Pearson in Aliens in the Attic
 Micah Sanders in Heroes
 Lex Martin in Flight 29 Down
 Billy Madsen in Wild Hogs
 Esqueleto/Steven in Nacho Libre
 Joe Lamb in Super 8
 Carl Montclaire in Wingin' It
 Jim in Chatroom
 Jimmy Boland in Falling Skies
 Zachary "Zach" Florrick in The Good Wife (TV series)
 Dustin in Hesher
 Noah Curtis in 2012
 Deuce Martinez in Shake It Up
 Peeta Mellark in The Hunger Games
 Ryder Scanlon in Melissa & Joey
 Dylan Mae in We Bought a Zoo
 Dante Ontero in Level Up (U.S. TV series)
 Danny Matheson in Revolution
 Charlie Kelmeckis in The Perks of Being a Wallflower
 Joffrey Baratheon in Game of Thrones 
 Dez in Austin & Ally
 Dustin Brooks in Zoey 101
 Aladdin in Aladdin
 Stanley Barber in I Am Not Okay with This

Video Games
 Phineas Flynn/Phineas-2 in Phineas and Ferb: Across the 2nd Dimension
 Jude Sharp in Inazuma Eleven
 Simba in Disney Friends

See also
 List of non-English-language Phineas and Ferb voice actors

References

External links
 

Italian male voice actors
1995 births
Living people
Male actors from Rome